Lalehabad may refer to:
 Lalehabad, Sistan and Baluchestan
 Lalehabad District, in Mazandaran Province
 Lalehabad Rural District, in Mazandaran Province